South Dunedin is a major inner city suburb of the New Zealand city of Dunedin. It is located, as its name suggests,  to the south of the city centre, on part of a large plain known locally simply as "The Flat". The suburb is a mix of industrial, retail, and predominantly lower-quality residential properties. 

The term South Dunedin is often used in a more general sense to refer to any or all of the various suburbs occupying The Flat, including St Kilda, Forbury, Kensington, Musselburgh, and Tahuna.

Geography
The flat land which makes up much of Dunedin's heart is enclosed to the south and east by Otago Harbour and to the north and west by a ridge of hills. At the southern end of central Dunedin, these hills form a ridge that (prior to reclamation) came close to the line of the harbour. To the south of this lies a broad plain, initially swampy but now drained and expanded by reclamation. This plain is the site of South Dunedin.

The boundaries of South Dunedin are vaguely defined. Though the area was a separate borough briefly in the late nineteenth century, the borders which delimited that borough are no longer widely used as descriptors for South Dunedin. One major exception is South Dunedin's boundary with St Kilda, which was a separate borough until far more recently. The line of Bay View Road is still seen as a border between South Dunedin and St Kilda. This notion is enhanced by the change of name of one of the suburbs' main arterial roads at this boundary, with King Edward Street becoming Prince Albert Road as it passes into St Kilda.

To the east, South Dunedin's natural limit is Otago Harbour, and to the north a ridge of hills also forms a topographical boundary. At the foot of this ridge, however, lies the small suburb of Kensington and parts of the much larger borough of Caversham. Caversham also marks a limit at the western edge of South Dunedin, though in both cases the exact boundaries are not well-defined.

Southern Endowment

Much of eastern South Dunedin is land reclaimed from Otago Harbour. The Southern Endowment was begun with rock removed during the cutting of Bell Hill in the central city during the nineteenth century. This largely extended the area around the wharves close to the heart of the city, but did not extend any further south until 1912, when a causeway was built along the head of the harbour. As part of an Otago Harbour Board scheme to reclaim land for industrial use, dredges started to pump tailings into the area behind the causeway in the 1940s. Reclamation continued for many years, and was not officially completed until the opening of Portsmouth Drive, which runs along the route of the 1912 causeway at the harbour edge, in 1978.

Most of the area of the southern endowment is industrial and storage, though it does contain a small park close to the wharf area and the major sports complex of The Edgar Centre close to its southern edge.

Cargill's Corner
At this junction, two main suburban arterial routes—King Edward Street and Hillside Road—cross. A small shopping mall, South City, is located at Cargill's Corner.

Cargill's Corner had, for many years, Dunedin's only "Barnes Dance" pedestrian crossing. Its use was stopped during the 1980s. In 2011, Dunedin City Council considered reintroducing Barnes Dance control at Cargill's Corner as part of other improvements, but the work has since been completed without the change in traffic control.

King Edward Street is aligned roughly north-south, linking with the southern end of Princes Street and the centre city in the north with the densely populated coastal suburb of St Kilda. Hillside Road links Andersons Bay Road, a further major suburban arterial, in the east with the suburbs of Caversham, Corstorphine and Saint Clair in the west and southwest.

Main roads

Smaller, older shops stretch south along King Edward Street and west along Hillside Road from Cargill's Corner. To the east, along Hillside Road and Anderson's Bay Road are larger supermarkets and wholesalers, notably Pak'n Save, The Warehouse, Countdown, and Mitre 10 Mega. Further along Anderson's Bay Road to the south and to the west on Hillside Road are numerous car sale yards and light industrial works. These extend into Caversham in the west, and across the reclaimed land which lies between Andersons Bay Road and Portsmouth Drive in the south and east. At its southern extreme, King Edward Street becomes increasingly residential, though there are also light industrial premises here.

This route, which roughly follows the original shoreline, connects with State Highway 1 and Dunedin's one-way street system in the north, and with the suburb of Musselburgh in the south. It also provides a major route from the centre city with Otago Peninsula.

Portsmouth Drive, a further arterial route, lies a further  to the east along the edge of Otago Harbour, at the edge of the reclaimed Southern Endowment. This route links the centre city with Portobello Road, the long, twisting route which travels the length of Otago Peninsula's harbour coast. It is named for Dunedin's American sister city of Portsmouth, Virginia.

Other important roads in South Dunedin include Timaru Street on the Southern Endowment, and several streets which cross or meet King Edward Street, linking it with Anderson's Bay Road in the east or the suburbs of Saint Clair and Forbury in the west. These include Macandrew Road, Melbourne Street, McBride Street, and Bay View Road, the latter of which forms the boundary between South Dunedin and St Kilda.

History
Prior to European settlement, much of the area of The Flat was poorly drained and marshy. Early settlement of the area took place along the hill fringes at Caversham and St. Clair. The arrival at St Clair of William Henry Valpy (1793–1852) in 1849 led to the first development of permanent roading in the area; Valpy, reputedly the wealthiest man in New Zealand, had a branch dray road built from Dunedin's central settlement to his St. Clair farm which ran along the edge of what is now South Dunedin. With the rapid expansion of the city at the time of the Otago Gold Rush of the 1860s, settlement expended, notably around what is now Hillside Road.

Chinese settlers were notable among early residents in the St Clair area, and largely through their effort the swampy land inland from the beach was drained and converted into market gardens. Much of the young city's vegetable production was centred on Chinese allotments in an area close to what is now Macandrew Road, Forbury, and there were further allotments in both Andersons Bay and Tainui. The opening of a quarry in the Forbury area (which provided building materials for the young city) also increased the impetus towards development of the southern end of the city.

South Dunedin became a borough in 1876, and by the turn of the twentieth century was a thriving industrial and residential town, as can be seen from its description in the 1905 Cyclopedia of New Zealand:

The borough amalgamated with Dunedin City in 1905, a year after its neighbour, Caversham.

Mayors of South Dunedin Borough
The following is a complete list of the mayors of South Dunedin Borough, from its inception in 1876, until its merger with Dunedin City in 1905:

Demographics
South Dunedin comprises two statistical areas: Hillside-Portsmouth Drive, which contains the industrial and warehousing areas; and Bathgate Park, which contains the residential and commercial areas.

Hillside-Portsmouth Drive

Hillside-Portsmouth Drive had a population of 99 at the 2018 New Zealand census, an increase of 24 people (32.0%) since the 2013 census, and a decrease of 6 people (-5.7%) since the 2006 census. There were 45 households. There were 66 males and 33 females, giving a sex ratio of 2.0 males per female. The median age was 38.8 years (compared with 37.4 years nationally), with 9 people (9.1%) aged under 15 years, 27 (27.3%) aged 15 to 29, 51 (51.5%) aged 30 to 64, and 15 (15.2%) aged 65 or older.

Ethnicities were 66.7% European/Pākehā, 15.2% Māori, 9.1% Pacific peoples, 18.2% Asian, and 3.0% other ethnicities (totals add to more than 100% since people could identify with multiple ethnicities).

The proportion of people born overseas was 27.3%, compared with 27.1% nationally.

Although some people objected to giving their religion, 60.6% had no religion, 24.2% were Christian, 6.1% were Hindu, 6.1% were Muslim and 3.0% had other religions.

Of those at least 15 years old, 6 (6.7%) people had a bachelor or higher degree, and 21 (23.3%) people had no formal qualifications. The median income was $22,600, compared with $31,800 nationally. 3 people (3.3%) earned over $70,000 compared to 17.2% nationally. The employment status of those at least 15 was that 42 (46.7%) people were employed full-time, 12 (13.3%) were part-time, and 9 (10.0%) were unemployed.

Bathgate Park

Bathgate Park had a population of 2,439 at the 2018 New Zealand census, an increase of 129 people (5.6%) since the 2013 census, and an increase of 81 people (3.4%) since the 2006 census. There were 1,233 households. There were 1,119 males and 1,317 females, giving a sex ratio of 0.85 males per female. The median age was 49.0 years (compared with 37.4 years nationally), with 324 people (13.3%) aged under 15 years, 405 (16.6%) aged 15 to 29, 1,032 (42.3%) aged 30 to 64, and 678 (27.8%) aged 65 or older.

Ethnicities were 78.8% European/Pākehā, 12.8% Māori, 6.6% Pacific peoples, 8.7% Asian, and 2.2% other ethnicities (totals add to more than 100% since people could identify with multiple ethnicities).

The proportion of people born overseas was 17.5%, compared with 27.1% nationally.

Although some people objected to giving their religion, 47.2% had no religion, 38.5% were Christian, 1.4% were Hindu, 0.7% were Muslim, 0.9% were Buddhist and 3.6% had other religions.

Of those at least 15 years old, 237 (11.2%) people had a bachelor or higher degree, and 705 (33.3%) people had no formal qualifications. The median income was $21,400, compared with $31,800 nationally. 69 people (3.3%) earned over $70,000 compared to 17.2% nationally. The employment status of those at least 15 was that 687 (32.5%) people were employed full-time, 270 (12.8%) were part-time, and 90 (4.3%) were unemployed.

Landmarks

The industrial heart of South Dunedin is the Hillside Railway Workshops, located immediately to the west of Cargills Corner. Other notable buildings in South Dunedin include the Mayfair Theatre, close to Cargill's Corner, and the Edgar Sports Centre, at the southeastern extremity of the suburb on Portsmouth Drive. The Mayfair Theatre has a New Zealand Historic Places Trust (NZHPT) Category II classification 

The city's former main sports complex, Carisbrook, is located close to the border of South Dunedin in Caversham. Another former stadium, the Caledonian Ground, stood on ground now largely occupied by The Warehouse retail store. It was relocated in 2000 to Logan Park in Dunedin North. The junction of Andersons Bay Road and Hillside Road, located nearby, is still sometimes referred to as "Caledonian Corner".

This corner is also the former site of the country's longest-serving gasworks, which operated from 1863 to 1987, and a small industrial museum, the Dunedin Gasworks Museum, is located on the southern part of its site on Braemar Street. Opened to the public in 2001, this museum is one of only three known preserved gasworks museums in the world. The museum features five steam pumping engines which were used in the gasworks, and an older engine imported from Scotland in 1868. Three of the buildings within the Gasworks complex have NZHPT classifications: the skeleton of the 1879 gasometer, the exhauster and boiler house, and the fitting shop (all Category I).

There are several notable churches in South Dunedin, among them two further NZHPT listings — the city's only Eastern Orthodox church, St. Michael's Antiochian Orthodox Church, in Fingall Street, and St. Patrick's Roman Catholic Basilica (designed by Francis Petre) in Macandrew Road (Category II).

Former landmarks
Other than the Hillside workshops and the gasworks, South Dunedin has several links with Dunedin's industrial heritage. Notable among these was the factory of G. Methven, one of New Zealand's leading bathroom fittings manufacturers. This company, founded by George Methven, was located for many years in Andersons Bay Road on a site now occupied by a Mitre 10 megastore. On the opposite side of Andersons Bay Road from this is the former location of one of the city's girls' secondary schools, Moreau College, which amalgamated with St. Paul's High School for boys in 1989 to become Kavanagh College. The Moreau site was disestablished, with the new school continuing on the St Paul's site in City Rise.

Another former landmark in South Dunedin was the former Caledonian sports ground. This was located opposite the gasworks at the corner of Hillside Road and Andersons Bay Road, a site still known as Caledonian Corner. The sports field was relocated to Dunedin North, and the site is now the car park of The Warehouse - all that remains of the original sports complex is a lawn bowls club and the gymnasium, which is also South Dunedin's main war memorial (Hillside Workshops have their own separate memorial by the site's main gate). The Caledonian was the site of the first human ascent in a hot-air balloon in New Zealand — and first parachute descent — performed by travelling showman Thomas Scott Baldwin on 21 January 1889.

References

Bibliography
Croot, Charles (1999) Dunedin Churches Past and Present. Dunedin: Otago Settlers' Association.
Hamel, Antony, (2008) Dunedin Tracks and Trails. Dunedin: Silver Peaks Press. 
Herd, Joyce, and Griffiths, George J., (1980) Discovering Dunedin. Dunedin: John McIndoe. 
Newton, Barbara A., (2003) Our St. Clair: A resident's history. Dunedin: Kenmore Productions.

Suburbs of Dunedin
Isthmuses of Oceania